The Legacy Fighting Alliance (LFA) is an American mixed martial arts (MMA) promotion company based in Houston, Texas. It was created as a result of the Legacy Fighting Championship and Resurrection Fighting Alliance merger in 2016.

History

Resurrection Fighting Alliance
On October 11, 2012, officials for the Pompano Beach, Florida based MMA promotion Titan Fighting Championships (Titan FC) were acquired by the Resurrection Fighting Alliance (RFA), along with certain fighter contracts, as well as the organization's television deal with what is now AXS TV. The goal was to combine the talent of both organizations under one umbrella, the RFA. Titan FC owner and president Joe Kelly was brought in as the vice president of the newly merged company; and seasoned MMA manager and Black House gym owner, Ed Soares, acted as president. Original Titan founder Joe Kelly bought back the organization (Titan FC) in 2013 and produced two more shows on his own: Titan FC 25: Lashley vs. Asplund in June, and Titan FC 26: Hallman vs. Hornbuckle in August, both of which were aired live on AXS TV.

On November 2, 2012, RFA had its first show aired on AXS TV with Resurrection Fighting Alliance 4: Griffin vs. Escudero.

Events

Legacy Fighting Championship
The Legacy Fighting Championship (Legacy FC) was an American mixed martial arts promotion based in Houston, Texas, United States. The promotion has held events in: Houston, Dallas, San Antonio, Allen, Tulsa, and Duluth. Notable fighters that have fought for LFC include Carlos Diego Ferreira, Leonard Garcia, Jonathan Brookins, Daniel Pineda, Anthony Njokuani, Paul Buentello, James McSweeney, Jay Hieron, Evangelista Santos, Ray Borg, Tim Means, Henry Briones, Thomas Almeida, Derrick Lewis, Sage Northcutt, Holly Holm and Valentina Shevchenko. Its live events and competitions have been broadcast on AXS TV in the United States and Esporte Interativo in Brazil.

On July 22, 2011, Legacy FC had its first show aired on HDNet with Legacy Fighting Championship 7: Dollar vs. Prater. The organization agreed to a second extension to take them through 2016 with newly branded AXS TV.

Events

Events

Scheduled events

Past events

Promotions
Legacy FC and Resurrection FA agreed to a co-promoted live event on May 8 that featured bouts with fighters from one organization battling the other. The event took place on May 8 and as part of the AXS TV FIGHTS franchise. The event was labeled AXS TV FIGHTS: RFA VS. Legacy Superfight. The main event featured a title bout as the Legacy FC and RFA flyweight champions fought for the AXS TV Super Fight title. In addition two Legacy FC fighters competed to crown a new lightweight champion, and the RFA bantamweight champion defended his title against a top RFA contender.

Merger
In September 2016 it was announced that Legacy FC & RFA would merge to create a new Legacy Fighting Alliance promotion. LFA had its first event on January 13, 2017, with Legacy FC and RFA bantamweight titles unification as the main fight.

Broadcasting
After about two and a half years of broadcasting Legacy Fighting Alliance, AXS TV was by owner Mark Cuban sold to Anthem Sports. Anthem disbanded the AXS TV Fights division. At UFC 244 it was announced UFC Fight Pass secured an exclusive on LFA broadcasts. On November 8, 2021, it was announced that the broadcasting deal with the UFC was renewed to last through 2025.

Champions

LFA Heavyweight Championship
120 kg (265 lb)

Notes

LFA Light Heavyweight Championship
93 kg (205 lb)

LFA Middleweight Championship
84 kg (185 lb)

LFA Welterweight Championship
77 kg (170 lb)

LFA Lightweight Championship
70 kg (155 lb)

LFA Featherweight Championship
66 kg (145 lb)

LFA Bantamweight Championship
61 kg (135 lb)

LFA Flyweight Championship
57 kg (125 lb)

LFA Women's Bantamweight Championship
61 kg (135 lb)

LFA Women's Flyweight Championship
57 kg (125 lb)

LFA Women's Strawweight Championship
52 kg (115 lb)

References

External links
 
 Legacy Fighting Alliance at Sherdog

 
2016 establishments in the United States
Mixed martial arts organizations
Sports organizations established in 2016
Mixed martial arts events lists